Llanos de Santa Lucía formerly known as Santa Lucía is the youngest of the districts of the Paraíso canton, in the Cartago province of Costa Rica. It was established as the fifth district on 21 July 2004.

History
Its main urban area, known as  Villa Llanos started as a "precario" on April, 1986. It was established as the fifth district of Paraíso by President Abel Pacheco de la Espriella  on 21 July 2004, thanks to its quickly population grow and its area of seven square kilometers.

Llanos de Santa Lucía was created on 24 May 2004 by Decreto Ejecutivo 31871-G.

Geography 
Llanos de Santa Lucía has an area of  km² and an elevation of  metres.

Demographics 

For the 2011 census, Llanos de Santa Lucía had a population of  inhabitants.

Transportation

Highways
 National Route 10, the main east-west route that connects San José with downtown Cartago, Turrialba and Limón.

Rail
The Interurbano Line operated by Incofer goes through this district. It is being reconstructed as of 2020 and passenger rail service will be provided in the future. The main passenger rail station is located near the Estadio Municipal Quincho Barquero in Downtown Llanos de Santa Lucía.

Public transportation
Public transit is provided by COOPEPAR RL. It consists entirely of buses serving the Llanos de Santa Lucía area and a service to Downtown Cartago.

References 

Districts of Cartago Province
Populated places in Cartago Province